Eduard 'Edu' Vílchez Ortiz (born 22 September 1967) is a Spanish retired footballer who played as a forward, and is a manager.

Club career
Born in Sabadell, Barcelona, Catalonia, Vílchez graduated from Real Madrid's youth setup. He made his professional debut on 9 September 1984, aged only 17, starting with the reserves in a 0–4 home loss against FC Barcelona B in the Segunda División championship. In the 1989 summer, after appearing regularly with Castilla, he joined CD Logroñés in La Liga.

Vílchez made his debut in the main category of Spanish football on 24 September 1989, starting in a 1–0 home win against Athletic Bilbao. He scored his first goal on 12 November, but in a 2–4 loss at FC Barcelona.

In September 1990 Vílchez moved to Real Valladolid, also in the top level. After appearing more regularly during the campaign, he signed for RCD Espanyol, but was used rarely by the latter.

In 1992 Vílchez joined Palamós CF, in the second level. He subsequently moved to Elche CF in Segunda División B in 1994, and resumed his career in the same division but also in Tercera División, representing Palamós, FC Palafrugell and CF Peralada; he retired with the latter in 2002, aged 35.

Manager career
Vílchez began his managerial career at ACD San Marcial in 2002, narrowly avoiding relegation in his second season. On 27 July 2004 he was appointed Logroñés manager, but later joined the youth setup after the club's administrative relegation.

In November 2004 Vílchez was appointed at CD Linares, but left the club in January of the following year, after a bad run of results. He eventually returned to Logroñés in the 2005 summer, before joining UD Los Barrios in February 2006.

On 7 July 2007 Vílchez was appointed at the helm of Peralada. After one season he resigned, and signed for Real Balompédica Linense on 11 June 2009.

On 17 August 2010 Vílchez returned to Peralada, now in the regional leagues. On 31 October 2012 he was appointed Palamós manager, taking the club to a comfortable 12th place.

On 12 June 2013 Vílchez signed a contract with UE Olot, being effective on 1 July. He was sacked on 29 December, after a winless run of seven games.

On 16 October 2014 Vílchez was appointed UE Figueres manager. He left the club in 2016, and remained nearly a year without a club before being named CF Pobla de Mafumet's assistant on 22 June 2017; he also acted as the club's interim for some matches before being promoted to the first team as a part of Rodri's staff.

On 13 November 2018, Vílchez was named Rodri's assistant at Extremadura UD. The following 19 February, after the manager's dismissal, he took over the first team in an interim manner.

Managerial statistics

References

External links

1967 births
Living people
Sportspeople from Sabadell
Spanish footballers
Footballers from Catalonia
Association football forwards
La Liga players
Segunda División players
Segunda División B players
Tercera División players
Real Madrid Castilla footballers
CD Logroñés footballers
RCD Espanyol footballers
Real Valladolid players
Palamós CF footballers
Elche CF players
CF Peralada players
Spain youth international footballers
Spanish football managers
Segunda División managers
Segunda División B managers
Palamós CF managers
UE Olot managers
UE Figueres managers
CF Pobla de Mafumet managers
Extremadura UD managers